Arvydas is a Lithuanian masculine given name. Notable people with the name include:

Arvydas Bagdžius, Lithuanian painter
Arvydas Bajoras (born 1956), Lithuanian politician
Arvydas Janonis, a retired football player
Arvydas Každailis, Lithuanian graphic artist
Arvydas Kostas Leščinskas, Lithuanian politician
Arvydas Macijauskas, basketball player
Arvydas Novikovas, football player
Arvydas Pocius, Chief of Defence of Lithuania
Arvydas Sabonis, a retired basketball player
Arvydas Šikšnius, basketball player

Lithuanian masculine given names